This is a list of dramas released by the Vietnam Digital Television network (VTC).

#B

#C

#Đ

#H

#K

#N

#S

#T

#V

See also
 List of dramas broadcast by Vietnam Television (VTV)
 List of dramas broadcast by Hanoi Radio Television (HanoiTV)
 List of programmes broadcast by VTC

Notes
Cinema for Youth (Vietnamese: Điện ảnh Trẻ, later Tạp chí Điện ảnh Trẻ) is a program for young Vietnamese filmmakers and audiences launched on 18 Feb, 2007. The dramas aired from 12:30 to 13:30 every Sunday (moved to 09:30 to 10:30 in 2008) as a part of the program.
Since June 27, 2015, VTC has become an affiliated units of VOV.

References

External links
VTC.gov.vn – Official VTC Digital Television Website 
VTC News – Official VTC Online Newspaper Website 
VOV.vn – Official VOV Online Newspaper Website 

Vietnam Television original programming
Vietnam Digital Television (VTC)
VTC